"American Remains" is a song written by Rivers Rutherford and originally recorded by the Highwaymen (Johnny Cash, Waylon Jennings, Kris Kristofferson, and Willie Nelson) for their 1990 album Highwaymen 2.

The song was chosen as the fifth track of the album and as a flip side to the lead single from it ("Silver Stallion" / "American Remains", Columbia 38-73233).

In October of the same year, it was again released as a single, this time coupled with "Texas".

Track listing

References 

1990 songs
1990 singles
Songs written by Rivers Rutherford
The Highwaymen (country supergroup) songs